Mark Cooney (born Mark Joseph Cooney) was a linebacker in the National Football League. Cooney was drafted by the Green Bay Packers in the sixteenth round of the 1974 NFL Draft and played that season with the team.

Cooney, then a linebacker at Colorado was named an MVP of the 1972 Gator Bowl, which Colorado lost 3–24 to Auburn.

Cooney was a long-time real estate broker in Arvada, Colorado. He was also a member of the Board of Elders of Faith Bible Chapel.

He died.

References

People from Arvada, Colorado
Green Bay Packers players
American football linebackers
Colorado Buffaloes football players
Players of American football from Denver
1951 births
2011 deaths